Noisy–Champs is a railway station on the RER train network at the border between Champs-sur-Marne, Seine-et-Marne and Noisy-le-Grand, Seine-Saint-Denis, France.

Description 
The station opened on 19 December 1980, when RER Line A was extended to Torcy. It serves the Descartes Campus of the University of Eastern Paris – Marne-la-Vallée (French: Université Paris-Est Marne-la-Vallée). Bus stations are on both ends of platforms: Champy is on Noisy-le-Grand side, Descartes on the Champs-sur-Marne side.

, the estimated annual attendance by the RATP Group was 5,614,935 passengers.

Transport

Train 
The average frequency is one train every 10 minutes to Paris and to Marne-la-Vallée–Chessy (however, some trains terminate at Torcy towards the east-side of the line).

Bus connections 
The station is served at both ends by several buses:
 On the west side at the stop called Noisy–Champs RER – Champy:
 On the east side at the stop called Noisy–Champs RER – Descartes:
 Transdev Lys (by Setra) Bus network line: 100 (at remote bus stops called Crous & Ampère) (between Créteil and Torcy) ;
  Noctilien network night bus line:  (between Paris (Gare de Lyon) and Marne-la-Vallée–Chessy - Disneyland).

Transport project 
Paris Métro Line 11 is expected to be extended to Noisy–Champs in 2030.

This station should also be the terminus of the future lines 15 in 2025 and 16 in 2030.

Gallery

References

Réseau Express Régional stations
Railway stations in France opened in 1980
Railway stations in Seine-et-Marne
Paris Métro line 16
Paris Métro line 15